Banakal is a Malnad town in Mudigere Taluk, Chikkamagaluru district of Karnataka, India.  This town is situated atop the Charmadi hills in the Western Ghats section.  The Western Ghats is one amongst twenty-five identified hot spots for biodiversity conservation in the world. Banakal is surrounded by coffee estates and paddy fields and known for its pleasant weather throughout the year.  Banakal town is the headquarters of Banakal Hobli.

Banakal lies on the banks of the Hemavati River. The Hemavati, which flows through Banakal, originates in Western Ghats. The geographical location of Banakal is 13°0'59" North and 75°53'9" East.

Culture 
The people lead a monotonous way of life irrespective of the religious diversities.  Generally life is slow-paced as it is seen in most of the agriculture dominant villages of Chickmagalur district.  The vokkaliga community is dominant and owns most of the landed property like agricultural fields and coffee estates.  Folk songs and folk dances are given much importance.  During special occasions men play Kolata - a group dance using sticks, and women do perform folk dances and folk songs like Bhaagyada balegaara hogi baa nanna tawarige are noteworthy. People live in harmony and show respect to each other in spite of religious differences.

Cuisine 
The Malnad food style is followed. Rice and wheat are a part of the daily menu. Traditional dishes like Rotti, Ganji-oota, Kadubu-chatni and shevige are eaten. Generally people are non-vegetarian.  Some traditional dishes like Edli-chatni, Iruve-chatni [chigaLi chuttney] Edi Sambar(Crab) and Maralu-meen-saru are now vanishing from the daily menu.

Language 
Like Are Bhashe spoken by the Gowdas of Sullia in Dakshina Kannada, the people in this region speak another dialect of Kannada which can be called Gowdra Bhashe.  This dialect is sweet and has powerful expressions. People belonging to the Tuluva community speak Tulu with Ghatta accent, little different than actual Tulu used in South Canara.  Local Muslims speak a dialect of Urdu known as Dakhini.  Bearys, the immigrant Muslims hailing from a neighboring district, Dakshina Kannada, and who are engaged in various small scale business activities do speak Beary bashe.

Festivals 
Suggi Habba is the main festival celebrated at the time of harvesting.  All Hindu festivals are celebrated by Gowdas and local communities.  Tulu speaking people also celebrate Hindu festivals.  Muslims observe Eid ul-Fitr and Eid ul-Adha as it is universally observed. Christians celebrate all Christian events and the local church festival is called Saint-Mary. Banakal Jatre is the car-festival that occurs once a year and attracts a lot of people from adjacent villages. Bhuta Kola and Kori Katta are the other events celebrated by mainly Tulu speaking communities, which is a cultural and  religious aspect as some Theyyam deities are propitiated through blood sacrifice or cock-sacrifice which does also include the cockfight and is a prime example of "cultural synthesis of 'little' and 'great' cultures".

Economy 
Agriculture is the main source of economy.  Rice which forms the chief food of people in southern India is the main crop and is being produced in large scale. Coffee plantations are another prime source of economy which makes the region distinctive and contributes to the national economy.  The coffee estates in this region became world famous when they began to compete with Brazil in both producing and exporting coffee beans. Both the genetic subspecies of high quality coffee, namely Robusta and Arabica, are being produced, processed and exported.  Black pepper and cardamom are the other economic crops.  Oranges have also been produced in some areas.  Honey and other forest products also contribute to the economy.

Flora and fauna 

Most of the land is brought under cultivation.  Paddy or rice fields provide multiple crops in a year based on monsoon. Coffee (both Robusta and Arabica) is the main plantation crop.  Other crops include black pepper, cardamom and produce of the forest. Good quality honey is abundantly available in this region. Tall straight Nilgiri plantation is found on the southern bank of river Hemavati alongside coffee plantation. Natural forests surround the village.  Wildlife and rich birdlife can also be seen. Teak and sandalwood are abundant.

Because of irregular prices lately people have lost interest in food crops. Economic crops have taken the place of food crops, and more land is used for that purpose.

People 
Generally lifestyle is slow-paced and people do live cordially irrespective of caste and religious differences.  Although Gowdas are economically dominant, Bunt   and Billava are the immigrant Tuluva communities from adjacent Dakshina Kannada also are seen.  The Muslim community can be identified as local Deccani (a dialect of Urdu and Hindi) speaking farmer community and immigrant Byari business community.  A good number of Christians belonging to Roman Catholic speaking Konkani and some Protestants also are inhabitants of Banakal. Byari and Kannada are main business language in Banakal.

Schools and educational institute 

 Government Junior College
 Government High School
 Vidyabharati – Nursery, middle school and high school
 Government Model Higher Primary School
 Government Urdu Higher Primary School
 Nazareth Convent
 River View School - Nursery and middle school
 Banakal Village School
 Sabli Village School

Religious institutes 
 Devaramane Kalabhairaveshwara
 Mahammayi Devasthana
 Eeshwara temple (village)

Mosques 
 Jamia Masjid
 Mohiyuddin Juma Masjid
 Quba Masjid

Church 
 Our Lady of Nativity Church (Built in 1970)

Banks and financial institutes 
 Karnataka Bank Ltd
 District co-operative Bank
Canara bank
Society bank banakal

Getting there 
 By road: any bus that commutes between Mangalore and Chickmagalur goes via Banakal
  from Kottigehara on K.M. Road, towards Chikkamagaluru
 The nearest railway station: Chikkamagaluru, Mangalore, Kadur and Hassan
 The nearest airport is at Bajpe: Mangalore International Airport

Nearby places 
The nearby places are Mudigere, Chickmagalur, Kottigehara, Charmadi ghats,  Dharmasthala, Kalasa, Kudremukh.

References

External links 
 Rivers of the Western Ghats

Villages in Chikkamagaluru district
Hill stations in Karnataka